Paul Louis Poty (30 August 1889, Chagny, Saône-et-Loire- 10 February 1962, Louhans ) was a French naturalist who specialised in ornithology. He was, from 1929, on the editorial committee of Alauda, Revue internationale d'Ornithologie :fr:Alauda, Revue internationale d'Ornithologie with its founder Paul Paris and Louis Lavauden, Noël Mayaud, Henri Heim de Balsac, Jacques de Chavigny, Henri Jouard and Jacques Delamain. He was a physician.

References
René Ronsil (1948) Bibliographie ornithologique française. Tome I. Bibliographie. Paul Lechevalier, Paris, 534 p.

French ornithologists
1962 deaths
1889 births
20th-century French zoologists